Giovanni Peak is a peak rising to about 500 m at the south end of Debussy Heights, above Mozart Ice Piedmont in the north part of Alexander Island, Antarctica.

First mapped from air photos taken by the Ronne Antarctic Research Expedition (RARE), 1947–48, by Searle of the Falkland Islands Dependencies Survey (FIDS) in 1960.  Named by United Kingdom Antarctic Place-Names Committee (UK-APC) in association with the Mozart ice piedmont after Mozart's opera Don Giovanni.

See also

 Saint George Peak
 Lamina Peak
 Landers Peaks

References

Mountains of Alexander Island
Cultural depictions of Wolfgang Amadeus Mozart